The Count Raniero Gnoli (born January 20, 1930 in Rome) is an Italian Orientalist, Indologist and historian of religion.

Biography

Student of Giuseppe Tucci and Mario Praz, Raniero Gnoli was a Professor of Indology at the University of Rome La Sapienza 1964 to 2000, as well as dean of the School of Oriental Studies at the same university.

Famous Sanskritist, his scope of research covered the theologies and religious philosophies of India, especially those related to Tantric Shaivism (i.e., Kashmir Shaivism), medieval schools of Buddhist logic, and doctrines mentioned in Kālacakratantra.

Gnoli was also the first to translate many texts belonging to the Indian religious traditions from Sanskrit into Western languages, contributing decisively to a more precise definition of the relevant terminology. To-date, he remains the only one in the world to have translated the voluminous work Tantrāloka written in the 10th century by Indian philosopher Abhinavagupta.

Expert also in Greek and Roman culture, he has compiled Marmora Romana, a thorough "study of the decorative stones used by the ancients, that the marble that, in the classic of the word, include all stones decoration likely to polish."

Raniero Gnoli is the brother of Gherardo Gnoli who has since 1996 been the president of the Italian Institute for Africa and the East.

Works

The full list of works by Raniero Gnoli was published in a collection of studies in his honor: Le Parole e i Marmi (The words and the marbles - ed. by Raffaele Torella ). Rome, IsIAO, 2001, pp. XVII-XX. These include:
 Marmora Romana. Rome, Elephant Editions, 1988 
 Thirteen poems. Rome, Elephant Editions, 1981
 La Rivelazione del Buddha (The Revelation of the Buddha - ed. by Raniero Gnoli, transl. by Claudio Cicuzza and Francesco Sferra) 2 vols. - I Testi Antichi (The Ancient Texts), 2001. Il Grande Veicolo (The Great Vehicle), 2004. Milan, Meridiani Mondadori.
 Memory of Giuseppe Tucci, Rome, IsIAO, 1985.
 The aesthetic experience according to Functional Abhinavagupta. Rome, IsIAO, 1956.
 Nepalese inscriptions in gupta characters. Rome, IsIAO, 1956.

Translations

 Abhinavagupta, Abhinavagupta. Light of scripture, Turin, typographical Union-Turin-based publishing, 1972.
 Abhinavagupta, Abhinavagupta's comment to Paratrimsika, (Parātrimśikātattvavivarana), Rome, IsIAO, 1985.
 Dharmakirti, The Pramanavarttikam of Dharmakirti. The First Chapter with Autocommentary (Pramānavārttikasvavrtti),Rome, IsIAO, 1960.
 Gabriele Faerno, Fables choices. Rome, Elephant Editions, 1970.
 Nāgārjuna, Le Stanze del Cammino di Mezzo (The Stanza of the Middle Way, Madhyamaka karika), introduction, translation and notes, Turin, Basic Books, 1979.
 Udbhata, Udbhata's commentary on the Kavyalankara Bhamaha of Rome, IsIAO, 1962.

References

Italian historians of religion
Italian Indologists
1930 births
Living people
Linguists from Italy
Sanskrit scholars